Mymensingh-3 is a constituency represented in the Jatiya Sangsad (National Parliament) of Bangladesh since 2016 by Nazim Uddin Ahmed of the Awami League.

Boundaries 
The constituency encompasses Gauripur Upazila.

History 
The constituency was created for the first general elections in newly independent Bangladesh, held in 1973.

Ahead of the 2008 general election, the Election Commission redrew constituency boundaries to reflect population changes revealed by the 2001 Bangladesh census. The 2008 redistricting altered the boundaries of the constituency.

Ahead of the 2014 general election, the Election Commission reduced the boundaries of the constituency. Previously it had also included one union parishad (Bishka) of Phulpur Upazila, and five union parishads of Mymensingh Sadar Upazila: Borar Char, Char Ishwardia, Char Nilakshmia, Paranganj, and Sirta.

Members of Parliament

Elections

Elections in the 2010s 
Mujibur Rahman Fakir died in May 2016. Nazim Uddin Ahmed of the Awami League was elected in a July by-election.

Elections in the 2000s

Elections in the 1990s 

Nazrul Islam died in office. R. Begum of the Awami League was elected in an October 1992 by-election.

References

External links
 

Parliamentary constituencies in Bangladesh
Mymensingh District